Mate Eterović (born 13 July 1984) is a Croatian retired footballer who last played for NK Postira Sardi.

Club career
Eterović began his career with Solin in the Croatian Druga HNL. He moved abroad to play for Maribor and Nafta Lendava in the Slovenian PrvaLiga and Debreceni II in the Hungarian NB II before returning to Solin in 2008. Before joining Mura 05, he played for Postira-Sardi in the 4. HNL. He joined club in 2010 and soon he became league top scorer. He scored six goals in record win of 13–1 against Slaven Gruda. He managed to score 39 goals in 22 games. On 29 May 2011 Mate played for a selection of football players from the island of Brač.
They played a friendly match against the Croatian national football team. Eterović scored the only goal for his team from a penalty in a 1–8 defeat. He joined Slovenian club ND Mura 05 on 24 June 2011. Eterović scored his first goal for Mura 05 on 17 October 2011 in 1–0 win over Celje.

References

External links
Profile at PrvaLiga 

1984 births
Living people
Footballers from Split, Croatia
Association football forwards
Croatian footballers
NK Solin players
NK Maribor players
NK Aluminij players
NK Nafta Lendava players
Debreceni VSC players
Kalamata F.C. players
ND Mura 05 players
NK Rudar Velenje players
Paykan F.C. players
NK Domžale players
First Football League (Croatia) players
Slovenian PrvaLiga players
Football League (Greece) players
Persian Gulf Pro League players
Croatian expatriate footballers
Expatriate footballers in Slovenia
Croatian expatriate sportspeople in Slovenia
Expatriate footballers in Hungary
Croatian expatriate sportspeople in Hungary
Expatriate footballers in Greece
Croatian expatriate sportspeople in Greece
Expatriate footballers in Iran
Croatian expatriate sportspeople in Iran